Irwin is a village in Kankakee County, Illinois, United States. The population was 74 at the 2010 census, down from 92 at the 2000 census. It is included in the Kankakee-Bradley, Illinois Metropolitan Statistical Area.

Geography
Irwin is located in southern Kankakee County at  (41.052757, -87.985479).

Demographics

As of the census of 2000, there were 92 people, 34 households, and 22 families residing in the village. The racial makeup of the village was 93.48% White, 1.09% Asian, 1.09% from other races, and 4.35% from two or more races. Hispanic or Latino of any race were 2.17% of the population.

There were 34 households, out of which 32.4% had children under the age of 18 living with them, 52.9% were married couples living together, 11.8% had a female householder with no husband present, and 32.4% were non-families. 32.4% of all households were made up of individuals, and 26.5% had someone living alone who was 65 years of age or older. The average household size was 2.71 and the average family size was 3.30.

In the village, the population was spread out, with 30.4% under the age of 18, 5.4% from 18 to 24, 26.1% from 25 to 44, 19.6% from 45 to 64, and 18.5% who were 65 years of age or older. The median age was 38 years. For every 100 females, there were 87.8 males. For every 100 females age 18 and over, there were 88.2 males.

The median income for a household in the village was $35,417, and the median income for a family was $38,750. Males had a median income of $24,167 versus $11,500 for females. The per capita income for the village was $19,027. None of the population and none of the families were below the poverty line.

Notable people 
 Arch Ward (1896-1955), sports editor for the Chicago Tribune, born in Irwin

References

Villages in Kankakee County, Illinois
Villages in Illinois